John William Woodmansee Jr.  (born 27 January 1934) is a retired lieutenant general in the United States Army. His assignments included Commanding General of V Corps. He graduated from the United States Military Academy in with a B.S. degree in military science in 1956. Woodmansee later earned an M.S. degree in public administration from George Washington University in 1965 and an M.A. degree in political science from Stanford University in 1973.

Trained as an armor officer and helicopter pilot, Woodmansee was awarded the Silver Star Medal, five Distinguished Flying Crosses, two Bronze Star Medals (2) and 39 Air Medals for his service during the Vietnam War, where he flew over 1,500 combat hours. Woodmansee has also received two Distinguished Service Medals and two awards of the Legion of Merit.

References

1934 births
Living people
United States Military Academy alumni
American Master Army Aviators
United States Army personnel of the Vietnam War
Recipients of the Air Medal
Recipients of the Distinguished Flying Cross (United States)
Trachtenberg School of Public Policy & Public Administration alumni
Recipients of the Silver Star
Stanford University alumni
Recipients of the Legion of Merit
United States Army generals
Recipients of the Distinguished Service Medal (US Army)